Umudioka is a town in Dunukofia Local Government Area in Anambra State, Southeastern Nigeria. It is made up of 10 villages, and shares boundaries with neighbouring towns as follows: Ogidi, Ogbunike, Umunya, Umunnachi and Ifite Dunu.

List of Villages: Olioba Section: Akpom, Umuezechua, Umuajana and Umuchigbo. Adagbe Section: Uruagu, Umuezekwo, Uruowelle, Umueze, Ugwu and Okpuru.
Umudioka is one of the six towns that make up  the ancient Dunukofia clan in Anambra state.

{{Authority control}}

Populated places in Anambra State